The Château de Villette is a château (a French manor house) located in Condécourt, France, 40 km (24.8 mi) northwest of Paris. There are numerous outbuildings including a chapel and adjacent reception room, horse stable and greenhouse.

History
The grounds provide outdoor activities for the château guests, including jogging, biking, and hunting. There is also a swimming pool and a tennis court. Jules Hardouin-Mansart and Le Nôtre designed the Palace of Versailles at the same time as they designed the Château de Villette in the 1680s. Therefore, Villette was nicknamed Le petit Versailles ("the little Versailles").

Films and television series
This French château was chosen to be a part of the shooting locations for a number of films and TV series:
 Sky Fighters (original French title: Les Chevaliers du ciel, first released in 2005), featuring a private mansion owned by the French Air Forces general staff.
 The Da Vinci Code (2006), in which  it is the home of Sir Leigh Teabing.
 In Paradisum (2012), a video by the German fashion and art photographer Iris Brosch.
 La Mante (2017), a television miniseries, featured the château to where the character Jeanne Deber is transferred.

External links
  The château website

Houses completed in the 17th century
Châteaux in Val-d'Oise
Gardens in Val-d'Oise
Hotels in France